Eccellenza Campania is the regional Eccellenza football league for clubs in the Southern Italian region of Campania, Italy. It is composed of 32 teams, divided into divisions A and B, which are 2 of the 28 total Eccellenza divisions in all of Italy. The two winners of the divisions are automatically promoted to Serie D. The two clubs that finish second are entered into a national play-off at the end of the regular season for a chance to gain one of seven Serie D promotions to the survivors of two rounds of double-leg ties.

Champions
Here are the past champions of the Campania Eccellenza, organised into their respective group.

Group A

1991–92 Gabbiano Napoli
1992–93 Portici 
1993–94 Boys Caivanese
1994–95 Giugliano
1995–96 Arzanese
1996–97 Sant'Anastasia
1997–98 Viribus Unitis
1998–99 Pro Sangiuseppese
1999–2000 Ercolano
2000–01 Gladiator
2001–02 Savoia
2002–03 Ercolano
2003–04 Acerrana
2004–05 El Brazil
2005–06 Ischia Benessere
2006–07 Caserta
2007–08 Pianura
2008–09 Casertana
2009–10 Atletico Nola
2010–11 Campania
2011–12 Savoia
2012–13 Marcianise
2013–14 Nerostellati Frattese
2014–15 Turris
2015–16 Herculaneum (Ercolano)
2016–17 Portici
2017–18 Savoia
2018–19 Giugliano
2019–20 Afragolese
2020–21 San Giorgio
2021–22 Palmese

Group B

1991–92 Paganese
1992–93 Nocerina
1993–94 Cavese
1994–95 Giovani Lauro
1995–96 Pro Ebolitana
1996–97 Angri 1927
1997–98 Sorrento
1998–99 Real Paganese
1999–00 Scafatese
2000–01 Angri 1927
2001–02 Ariano Irpino
2002–03 Spigolatrice Sapri
2003–04 Scafatese
2004–05 Pro Ebolitana
2005–06 Sant'Antonio Abate
2006–07 Comprensorio Gelbison
2007–08 Città di Vico Equense
2008–09 Forza e Coraggio
2009–10 Battipagliese
2010–11 Serre Alburni
2011–12 Agropoli
2012–13 Vico Equense
2013–14 Virtus Scafatese
2014–15 Gragnano
2015–16 Città di Nocera
2016–17 Ebolitana
2017–18 Sorrento
2018–19 San Tommaso
2019–20 Santa Maria Cilento
2020–21 Mariglianese
2021–22 Puteolana

References

Cam
Sport in Campania
Sports leagues established in 1991
1991 establishments in Italy
Football clubs in Italy
Association football clubs established in 1991